Argyractoides is a genus of moths of the family Crambidae.

Species
Argyractoides albibasalis (Schaus, 1912)
Argyractoides catenalis (Guenée, 1854)
Argyractoides chalcistis (Dognin, 1910)
Argyractoides cuprescens (Hampson, 1917)
Argyractoides gontranalis (Schaus, 1924)
Argyractoides leucogonialis Hampson, 1906
Argyractoides lucianalis (Schaus, 1924)
Argyractoides nitens (Schaus, 1912)
Argyractoides productalis (Hampson, 1917)
Argyractoides rinconadalis (Schaus, 1924)
Argyractoides samealis (C. Felder, R. Felder & Rogenhofer, 1875)
Argyractoides volcanalis (Schaus, 1912)

References

 , 1956: A generic revision of the aquatic moths of North America: (Lepidoptera: Pyralidae, Nymphulinae). Wasman Journal of Biology, San Francisco 14 (1): 59–144. Full article: .

Acentropinae
Crambidae genera